Dyna Music Entertainment Corporation is a Filipino record label. It is one of the major record companies in the Philippines; in the 1960s, it was the country's largest licensee of foreign labels. The first independent record label in the Philippines, Dyna Music was founded as Dyna Products Inc. by businessman James Go Dy in 1959. It is a member of the Philippine Association of the Record Industry (PARI).

Dyna Music also released video karaoke VCDs versions of the label's songs in the Philippines. It also became the first recording company in the country to produce and distribute a large catalogue of audiophile CD titles from the label's homegrown and foreign artists, using 24-bit, 192 kHz digitally remastered audio technology.

History 
Dyna was established in 1957 by James Go Dy. It became the first recording label in the Philippines. During most of the period from 1970s to the 1990s, It was the local distributor for PolyGram (including MGM Records, Polydor Records, Casablanca Records, RSO Records, Mercury Records, Fontana Records, Island Records, A&M Records, and London Records) Hansa Records (for Modern Talking releases only), and EMI Records (under the name Dyna EMI and later Dyna EMI Virgin). In the late 1980s and in the mid-1990s, Dyna did not renew their contracts with both EMI and PolyGram, and two local companies assumed distribution of their releases, Cosmic Records assumed distribution of PolyGram releases and later became PolyCosmic Records in 1993, then PolyGram Records Philippines in 1997, and after the merger with Universal Music Group in 1999, MCA Music Inc. (now known as UMUSIC Philippines), while EMI signed with OctoArts International in 1995, and they became OctoArts-EMI, which eventually became PolyEast Records.

Notable artists

References

External links
 

1959 establishments in the Philippines
Companies based in Pasig
Philippine independent record labels
Pop record labels
Record labels established in 1959